Tibetan Prayer is the debut studio album by Tibetan musician Yungchen Lhamo. The album was self-released in 1995..

At the ARIA Music Awards of 1995, the album won the ARIA Award for Best World Music Album.

Track listing 
 "Om Mane Padme Hung" - 3:53
 "Ari Lo" - 3:56
 "Gyalwa Tenzing Gyaltso" - 4:14
 "Tenyung" - 1:15
 "Omar Chung Chung" - 2:16
 "Gong Shey" - 1:24
 "Sangye Choe Dan Tsog" - 6:38
 "Lama Dorje Chang" - 5:11
 "Gi Pai Po Yul Cho-La" - 3:43

References 

1995 albums
ARIA Award-winning albums